Children in Scotland (Clann an Alba) is the national agency for voluntary, statutory and professional organisations and individuals working with children and their families.  Established in 1983 as the Scottish Child and Family Alliance, it now has over 400 member organisations. It is a registered charity, based in Edinburgh. Dame Denise Coia served as convener from 2017 to 2019.

It works in partnership with sister organisations National Children’s Bureau (in England), Children in Wales and Children in Northern Ireland to form the 4 Nations Child Policy Network.

References

External links
 

Organisations supported by the Scottish Government
Social programs
Non-profit organisations based in Scotland
Welfare in Scotland
1983 establishments in Scotland
Organizations established in 1983
Children's charities based in Scotland
Organisations based in Edinburgh